Nimona is an upcoming American computer-animated science fantasy adventure comedy film based on the comic series of the same name by ND Stevenson. The film is directed by Nick Bruno and Troy Quane and written by Marc Haimes. It features the voices of Chloë Grace Moretz, Riz Ahmed, and Eugene Lee Yang.

Originally a production of Blue Sky Studios, a former subsidiary of 20th Century Fox, best known for creating the Ice Age and Rio franchises, it was originally set to be directed by Patrick Osborne, with an initial release date of 2020. Following Disney's acquisition of 21st Century Fox, the production received pushback from Disney's new leadership due to the film's LGBTQ themes, after which it was delayed multiple times before being canceled due to Blue Sky's closure in April 2021.

On April 11, 2022, it was announced that Annapurna Pictures had revived the project, with DNEG Animation taking over animation, and Netflix acquiring worldwide distribution, set for a 2023 release.

Premise
Nimona, a teenager with the power to shapeshift, is targeted by a knight for assassination. The knight's mission to kill Nimona becomes complicated when he is accused of a crime, and learns that Nimona may be able to exonerate him.

Voice cast
 Chloë Grace Moretz as Nimona, a shapeshifter who insists on being the sidekick to Ballister Blackheart.
 Riz Ahmed as Ballister Blackheart, a former knight for the Institution who was kicked out when he lost an arm in a joust with Ambrosius Goldenloin.
 Eugene Lee Yang as Ambrosius Goldenloin, the champion knight of the Institution.

Production

Development
In June 2015, 20th Century Fox Animation acquired the rights for an animated feature film adaptation of Nimona, a webcomic by ND Stevenson. Patrick Osborne was set to direct, from a screenplay by Marc Haimes.

The film was to be produced by Fox's former subsidiary, Blue Sky Studios, alongside Vertigo Entertainment. In June 2017, 20th Century Fox scheduled Nimona to be released on February 14, 2020.

Acquisition by Disney and delays 
In March 2019, Disney completed its acquisition of Fox, then in May 2019, the film was delayed to March 5, 2021. In November 2019, the film was delayed again to January 14, 2022. Through 2020 there was word that the film would be released in 2022, Stevenson stated in June 2020 that the film was still happening, and said the same in an August 2020 podcast. In August of that same year, Den of Geek reported that the animated film was still scheduled to be released in 2022, but gave no further details, with Deadline reporting the same in October.

Cancellation and aftermath
On February 9, 2021, Disney announced it was shutting down Blue Sky Studios, and that production of the film was canceled.

Following the announcement, Stevenson said it was a "sad day" and that he wished the best for everyone who worked at Blue Sky Studios, while Osborne said he was "truly heartbroken" that the studio was closing its doors. Webcomics commenter Gary Tyrrell criticized the decision, saying, "[Disney] could have allowed a very different kind of young heroine... I mourn for those who would have found a vision of themselves in an animated version". Anonymous staffers at Blue Sky interviewed by Business Insider bemoaned the cancellation of the film, calling it "heartbreaking," arguing that the film "didn't look like anything else in the animated world," and saying that they believe it will never "be completed and released." The film was set to be the first use of Blue Sky's Conduit, a system that allowed artists to "find, track, version and quality control their work." Had it been made, it would have been Blue Sky's first film with LGBT representation, as a few staffers confirmed to BuzzFeed News that the film had an "I love you" scene between Ballister Blackheart and Ambrosius Goldenloin.

Sources told CBR that the film was "75% complete". One staffer stated that before being canceled, the film was "on track" to being finished by October 2021. A former animator at Blue Sky, Rick Fournier, stated that the studio was "very very close" to getting the film finished, but that they "found out it simply was not doable."

In March 2021, it was reported that Chloë Grace Moretz and Riz Ahmed were to have voiced Nimona and Ballister Blackheart, respectively, and that the film was being shopped around to other studios to be completed. In June 2021, Mey Rude, a writer for Out, said she still held out "hope that this film … will find its way back to life somehow."

In March 2022, amid the controversy of Disney's involvement in Florida's "Don't Say Gay" bill and lack of criticism from CEO Bob Chapek until after the bill had passed, three former Blue Sky staff members stated the film received pushback from Disney leadership, centered around the film's LGBT themes and a same-sex kiss.

Revival
On April 11, 2022, it was announced that Annapurna Pictures had picked up Nimona earlier in the year, and would be releasing it on Netflix in 2023. The voice cast was also retained, with the addition of Eugene Lee Yang as Ambrosius Goldenloin announced at this point. Nick Bruno and Troy Quane were announced as the new directors of the film, having previously directed Blue Sky's last film Spies in Disguise (2019). Quane started working on the film in March 2020. Bruno and Quane were heavily involved in the film, acting as directors, according to a Blue Sky staffer. DNEG Animation was announced to have taken over animation of the film concurrent with the Netflix/Annapurna acquisition. Much of what Blue Sky did remains intact, as Netflix and Annapurna did not start from scratch. Additionally, Goldenloin was changed to be Asian. Animation wrapped on October 1, 2022.

In March 2023, Aidan Sugano, a production designer on the series, told Animation Magazine that he was "thankful" to be part of the project, and described it as having elements of "sci-fi, medieval fantasy, knights, lasers, monsters, dragons, dramatic lighting, [and]...style".

Release
Nimona is set to be released on Netflix in the summer of 2023. It will be the first release from Annapurna Animation. It has been rated PG for "violence and action, thematic elements, some language and rude humor" by the Motion Picture Association.

See also
List of unproduced Disney animated projects
List of unproduced 20th Century Studios animated projects

References

External links

Upcoming films
Upcoming Netflix original films
2020s American animated films
2023 films
2023 computer-animated films
American animated fantasy films
American computer-animated films
American LGBT-related films
British animated fantasy films
British computer-animated films
Animated films based on comics
Annapurna Pictures films
Upcoming English-language films
Films about shapeshifting
Films based on American comics
Films based on webcomics
Films directed by Nick Bruno
Films directed by Troy Quane
Films impacted by the COVID-19 pandemic
LGBT-related animated films
British LGBT-related films
Vertigo Entertainment films
2020s American films
2020s British films
LGBT-related science fiction films
2023 LGBT-related films